The Ryedale by-election took place on 8 May 1986. The election was held on the same day as the 1986 local elections and the West Derbyshire by-election

It is the latest by-election to have just three candidates standing.

The seat was regained by the Conservatives the next year at the 1987 general election by John Greenway.

Background

In the spring of 1986 unemployment began rising at a greater rate than in previous years and the Conservative loss at Ryedale was a factor (according to Nigel Lawson) in "even committed supporters of the Government's economic strategy...insisting that reducing unemployment should now have priority".

Result

See also
Ryedale (UK Parliament constituency)
 Thirsk and Malton (UK Parliament constituency)
 List of United Kingdom by-elections

Notes

Ryedale by-election
Ryedale by-election
Ryedale by-election
By-elections to the Parliament of the United Kingdom in North Yorkshire constituencies
Ryedale
1980s in North Yorkshire